Okaikwei Central is one of the constituencies represented in the Parliament of Ghana. It elects one Member of Parliament (MP) by the first past the post system of election. The Okaikwei Central constituency is located in the Greater Accra Region of Ghana.

Boundaries 
The constituency is located within the Accra Metropolis District of the Greater Accra Region of Ghana.

Members of Parliament

See also
 List of Ghana Parliament constituencies
 List of political parties in Ghana

References

Parliamentary constituencies in the Greater Accra Region